Somayajulu is a Telugu first name (given name) that may refer to:
 S. N. Somayajulu, an Indian politician
Jonnalagadda Venkata Somayajulu, an Indian film actor
 Chaganti Somayajulu, a Telugu writer

Note: It is customary in the Telugu tradition to write the surname first followed by the given name.

Hindu given names
Indian given names
Telugu given names
Given names
Telugu names
Indian masculine given names